Events in the year 1659 in India.

Events
The reign of Aurungzebe begins (reigned till 1707).

References

 
India
Years of the 17th century in India